Events in the year 1962 in Ireland.

Incumbents
 President: Éamon de Valera
 Taoiseach: Seán Lemass (FF)
 Tánaiste:  Seán MacEntee (FF)
 Minister for Finance: James Ryan (FF)
 Chief Justice: Cearbhall Ó Dálaigh 
 Dáil: 17th 
 Seanad: 10th

Events
 26 February – The Irish Republican Army officially called off its Border Campaign in Northern Ireland.
 13 March – Irish artists left Dublin Airport for the Congo to entertain United Nations troops there.
 17 March – President Éamon de Valera and Mrs. Sinéad de Valera had a private audience with Pope John XXIII in Rome.
 5 April – A final train ran on the west Cork railway.
 8 May – Irish troops left for a peace-keeping mission in the Congo.
 6 July – Gay Byrne presented the first edition of The Late Late Show television programme on RTÉ. Byrne went on to present the show for 37 years, the longest period through which anyone hosted a televised talk show anywhere in the world, and the show itself becomes the world's second longest-running talk show.
 13 July – Secretary General of the United Nations U Thant arrived in Dublin.  He paid tribute to Irish soldiers who fought in the Congo.
 21 August – Former United States President Dwight D. Eisenhower arrived in Belfast on a four-day visit to Ireland.
 13 November – Aer Lingus air hostesses received new uniforms. The colours were fern-green and St. Patrick's blue.

Arts and literature
 30 June – The Theatre Royal, Dublin closed.
 4 December – The first Jacob's Awards ceremony took place in Dublin.
 Irish folk music group the Abbey Tavern Singers was formed in Howth.
 Irish folk music band The Chieftains was formed by Paddy Moloney in Dublin.
 Irish folk music band The Dubliners was formed at O'Donoghue's Pub in Dublin.
 Eavan Boland published 23 Poems while an undergraduate at Trinity College Dublin.
 Ewart Milne's poetry A Garland for the Green was published.
 Eoghan Ó Tuairisc published his Irish language prose epic L'Attaque in Dublin.
 Cecil Woodham-Smith published her history The Great Hunger: Ireland: 1845–1849.

Sports
 Shelbourne FC won the League of Ireland championship for the seventh time with a 1–0 play-off victory over Cork Celtic thanks to a Ben Hannigan goal.

Births
 1 January – Jamie O'Neill, author.
 9 January – Ray Houghton, international association football player, in Scotland to an Irish father.
 2 March – Marie-Louise Fitzpatrick, children's author and illustrator.
 13 April – Harry Kenny, association football player.
 7 May – Paul Kimmage, cyclist and sports journalist.
 9 June – Bobby Browne, association football player.
 15 June – Martin Earley, road bicycle racer.
 26 June – Cyprian Brady, Fianna Fáil Teachta Dála (TD) for Dublin Central.
 4 July – Martin Hayes, fiddle player.
 11 July – Pauline McLynn, actress and writer.
 14 July – Eamon Delaney, author and journalist.
 19 July – Caitríona Ruane, Sinn Féin party Member of the Legislative Assembly and Minister for Education in Northern Ireland.
 14 August
 Dan Boyle, former Green Party TD, Senator.
 Peter Eccles, association football player.
 1 September – Tony Cascarino, international association football player.
 11 October
 Anne Enright, Man Booker Prize-winning author.
 Eddie Hobbs, financial adviser and television presenter.
 2 December – Kevin Brady, association football player.
 Full date unknown – Tom Spillane, Kerry Gaelic footballer.

Deaths
 1 February – Thomas Westropp Bennett, Cumann na nGaedheal party member of the Seanad, Cathaoirleach (chairperson) of Seanad (born 1867).
 13 March – Anne Acheson, sculptor (born 1882).
 14 March – Eileen Costello, Independent member of 1922 Seanad.
 25 June – Robert Gwynn, cricketer (born 1877).
 4 July – William Harman, cricketer (born 1869).
 16 July – Frank Gallagher, Irish Volunteer and author (born 1893).
 24 July – Margaret Buckley, president of Sinn Féin party from 1937 to 1950 (born 1879).
 October – Emily Anderson, British Foreign Office official and scholar of German (born 1891).

See also
 1962 in Irish television

References

 
1960s in Ireland
Ireland
Years of the 20th century in Ireland